Nankai High School may refer to:

Tianjin Nankai High School
Chongqing Nankai Secondary School

See also
Nankai. a family of schools in China